Gudivada (rural) is a village in Krishna district of the Indian state of Andhra Pradesh. It is located in Gudivada mandal of Nuzvid revenue division.

See also 
Villages in Gudivada mandal

References

Villages in Krishna district